Edward Roy Pike FRS (born 4 December 1929 in Perth, Australia) is an Australian physicist, specializing in quantum optics.

He studied at Oxford University and from 1958 to 1960 was a Fulbright Scholar at Massachusetts Institute of Technology. From 1960 to 1991 he was in the Royal Signals and Radar Establishment, from 1967 as leading scientist, from 1973 as Deputy Chief Scientific Officer and from 1984 as Chief Scientific Officer. From 1984 to 1986 he was guest professor at Imperial College, London. From 1986 he was Clerk-Maxwell Professor for Theoretical Physics at King's College London, and from 1991 to 1994 head of its School of Physical Sciences and Engineering, later becoming Emeritus Professor of Physics.

From 1995 to 2004 he was a director of the software company Stilo Technology Ltd (from 2002 chairman). From 1981 to 1985 he was chairman of the publisher Adam Hilger Ltd. He founded Fonologica Ltd, a speech recognition software company, in 2004.

He received the Faraday Medal in 1996. He is a Fellow of the Royal Society, and received its Charles Parsons Prize in 1975, and a fellow of the Institute of Physics, of which he was vice president from 1981 to 1985.

Publications
He was co-author with Sarben Sarkar of The Quantum Theory of Radiation (Clarendon Press, 1995).

He was editor or joint editor of the following:
 Photon Correlation and Light Beating Spectroscopy (joint editor, 1974) 
 High Power Gas Lasers (editor, 1975)
 Photon Correlation Spectroscopy and Velocimetry (joint editor, 1977)
 Frontiers in Quantum Optics (joint editor, 1986)
 Chaos, Noise and Fractals (joint editor, 1987)
 Quantum Measurement and Chaos (joint editor, 1987)
 Squeezed and Non-classical Light (joint editor, 1988)
 Photons and Quantum Fluctuations (joint editor, 1988)
 Inverse Problems in Scattering and Imaging (joint editor, 1991)
 Photon Correlation and Light Scattering Spectroscopy (joint editor, 1997)
 Scattering (joint editor, 2002)

References

External links
 KCL research portal

Australian physicists
Fellows of the Royal Society
1929 births
Living people
Academics of King's College London
Fellows of King's College London